Cribb (Sergeant Cribb in North America) is a television police drama, which debuted in 1979 as a 90-minute TV film from Granada Television in the United Kingdom. Later, thirteen 50-minute episodes were produced, which ran from 1980 to 1981.

Adapted from Peter Lovesey's Sergeant Cribb historical mystery novels and set in Victorian London around the time of the Jack the Ripper murders in 1888, Alan Dobie starred as the tough Detective Sergeant who worked for the newly formed Criminal Investigation Department (CID), determined to remove crime from the streets of London using the latest detection methods.

The series portrayed life in Victorian England, and the programmes included many real historical events such as the publication of Jerome K. Jerome's Three Men in a Boat and the sale of London Zoo's famous elephant, Jumbo, to Barnum and Bailey's Circus. The stories included issues such as bare-knuckle prize fighting, spiritualism and Irish terrorism. Assisting Cribb was Detective Constable Thackery, played by William Simons.

The 1979 pilot episode was entitled "Waxwork" and featured Carol Royle and Susie Blake and was produced and directed by June Wyndham-Davies.

Main cast
 Alan Dobie as Sergeant Daniel Cribb
 William Simons as Constable Edward Thackeray
 David Waller as Inspector Jowett

Episodes

Series 1

Series 2

DVD 
Cribb is available on Region 2 DVD as a box set, distributed by Acorn Media UK. The series has been released in Region 1 by BFS Video.

Radio dramatizations
Six of the stories from Series 1 have also been dramatized for radio by Geoffrey M Matthews as part of the BBC Saturday Night Theatre strand.

References

External links
 
 Cribb on DVD Verdict

1970s British crime television series
1970s British drama television series
1970s British mystery television series
1979 British television series debuts
1980s British crime television series
1980s British drama television series
1980s British mystery television series
1981 British television series endings
English-language television shows
ITV television dramas
Television shows produced by Granada Television
Television series set in the 1880s
Television shows set in London